Adrian Grigoryevich Shaposhnikov, (1888 – 1967) was both a Soviet classical music composer and a People's Artist of the Turkmen Soviet Socialist Republic. His style is similar to Alexander Gretchaninov's. His only familiar work is his Sonata for Flute and Harp, which has been recorded several times.

References

Soviet classical composers
1888 births
1967 deaths
Turkmenistan classical composers
Turkmenistan opera composers
Russian opera composers
Male opera composers
Soviet opera composers
20th-century Turkmenistan musicians
20th-century Russian male musicians